The 37th National Basketball Association All-Star Game was played on February 8, 1987, at Seattle's Kingdome. Seattle SuperSonics power forward Tom Chambers was the NBA All-Star Game Most Valuable Player (MVP).

The Eastern Conference team consisted of the Washington Bullets' Moses Malone and Jeff Malone, the Philadelphia 76ers' Julius Erving, Maurice Cheeks and Charles Barkley, the Boston Celtics' Larry Bird, Robert Parish and Kevin McHale, the Detroit Pistons' Isiah Thomas and Bill Laimbeer, the Atlanta Hawks' Dominique Wilkins and the Chicago Bulls' Michael Jordan.

In addition to game MVP Tom Chambers, the Western Conference team featured the Los Angeles Lakers' Magic Johnson, James Worthy and Kareem Abdul-Jabbar, the Golden State Warriors' Sleepy Floyd and Joe Barry Carroll, the Dallas Mavericks' Rolando Blackman and Mark Aguirre, the San Antonio Spurs' Alvin Robertson, the Phoenix Suns' Walter Davis, the Denver Nuggets' Alex English and the Houston Rockets' Akeem Olajuwon. Houston's Ralph Sampson was selected but unable to play due to injury.

The coach of the Eastern team was Boston's K.C. Jones. The coach of the Western team was the Lakers' Pat Riley.

Rosters

Ralph Sampson was unable to play due to injury. Tom Chambers was selected as his replacement.
Western Conference head coach Pat Riley chose Tom Chambers to start in place of the injured Sampson.

Score by periods
 

Halftime— West, 70-65
Third Quarter— East, 107-100
Officials: Jess Kersey and Hue Hollins
Attendance: 34,275.

NBA All-Star Legends Game
This fourth annual event featured the East including Pete Maravich, Dave Cowens, John Havlicek,  Sam Jones, Walt Frazier, Paul Silas, Bob Cousy, Johnny Green, Wes Unseld, Harry Gallatin and Oscar Robertson.
The West squad included  Fred Brown, Spencer Haywood, Slick Watts, Jerry Lucas, Geoff Petrie, Terry Dischinger, Nate Thurmond, Tiny Archibald, Zelmo Beaty, and Ed Macauley.

External links
 1987 NBA All-Star Game
1987 NBA All-Star Game Voting

National Basketball Association All-Star Game
All-Star
Basketball competitions in Seattle
February 1987 sports events in the United States
1987 in sports in Washington (state)
1980s in Seattle